Salit bin 'Amr 'Ala bin Hadrami was a 7th-century Muslim emissary to Bahrain.

He was among the 83 Makkans Muslims who migrated to Ethiopia from Mecca after undergoing harrowing feats of persecution by the Quraishi idolators. Their contingent was headed by Muhammad's cousin Ja`far bin Abī Tālib, Uthman, Rkia (the daughter of the Muhammad and Khadija).

During the period of the persecution between AD 610 to 615 (when they first immigrated), they were constantly taunted thus "Look the fire worshipers of Iran are winning victories and the Christian believers in Revelation and Prophethood are being routed everywhere. Likewise, we, the idol worshipers of Arabia, will exterminate you and your religion.". This was the period the Persian King Khusrau Parvez attacked and captured large parts of the territory of the Roman Empire in response to Emperor Phocas deposing and killing Emperor Maurice.

The prowess of the Persian Empire had reached a crescendo that it was unbelievable it would crumble in a few years. However, Allah revealed Surat Ar-Rum, informing Muslims, that indeed in a few years the Byzantine (Roman) Empire would claim victory over Persia and in the same time when that happens, the Muslims would rejoice in triumph over idol worshipers.

By 627 this revelation had proven true, as the Persian Empire had lost much of its territory and even its king killed by his own son. The Sassanid King Khusrau Parvez was murdered by his son Shirviyah, a night after he had sent soldiers to arrest Muhammad, hence the word assassinate was coined.

The Ruler of Bahrain, Al-Mundhir bin Sawa, was a Christian so Muhammad felt that Salit bin 'Amr 'Ala bin Hadrami, who had lived among the Christians in Ethiopia and understood their traditions was the right emissary.

References

Companions of the Prophet
Medieval Bahrain
History of Ethiopia
Year of birth missing
Year of death unknown